Ible (pronounced 'eyebull', or 'ib-ull') is a hamlet in Derbyshire, England, just within the Peak District National Park.

It is near the Via Gellia valley, the historic market town of Wirksworth and village of Bonsall, and is on the route of the Limestone Way and the Peak District Boundary Walk.

The name of the hamlet is derived from the Old English for "Ibba's Hollow".

References

External links

 GENUKI(tm) page
 Wirksworth.net, your Wirksworth Online
 

Towns and villages of the Peak District
Hamlets in Derbyshire
Derbyshire Dales